The 2014–15 Luxembourg National Division was the 101st season of top-tier football in Luxembourg. It began on 1 August 2014 and ended on 23 May 2015. F91 Dudelange were the defending champions having won their eleventh league championship in the previous season.

Teams

League table

Results

Relegation play-offs
A match was played between the 12th placed (UN Käerjéng 97) team in the 2014–15 Luxembourg National Division and the 3rd placed (Strassen) team in the 2014–15 Luxembourg Division of Honour. The winner earned a place in the 2015–16 Luxembourg National Division.

Top goalscorers

See also
2014–15 Luxembourg Cup

References

External links

Luxembourg National Division seasons
Lux
1